Pat Blair (born 27 January 1990) is an American professional rugby union player. He plays as a hooker or flanker for the San Diego Legion in Major League Rugby (MLR) and previously for the USA 7s team and USA internationally.

References

1990 births
Living people
American rugby union players
Rugby union hookers
Rugby union flankers
San Diego Legion players
United States international rugby union players